On November 30, 1994, following the 1994 parliamentary election, the Communist Party of Nepal (Unified Marxist-Leninist) formed a minority government led by Man Mohan Adhikari. Despite the Nepali Congress securing more popular votes than the Communist Party of Nepal (Unified Marxist-Leninist), the latter secured 88 seats to the former's 83. Neither party was successful in forming a coalition to hold a majority of the 205 seats. After failed coalition negotiations, Adhikari became Prime Minister of a minority government, acquiring the support of the Rastriya Prajatantra Party and the Nepal Sadbhawana Party.

Adhikari only served as the Prime Minister of Nepal for nine months and was the first democratically elected Prime Minister from the Communist Party of Nepal (Unified Marxist-Leninist). During his time in office, then chief of the World Bank, Paul Wolfowitz rejected funding the Arun III hydro-electric project Also, the Adhikari government promoted programs such as the build-your-own-village-program. Prime Minister Adhikari also enhanced the relationship with Mongolia.

In June 1995, the Rastriya Prajatantra Party and the Nepal Sadbhawana Party, who helped to form a minority government supported the Nepali Congress's call for a vote of no-confidence in Adhikari's government in a special session of the House of Representatives. Adhikari attempted to dissolve parliament and call elections in an attempt to replicate the circumstances under which he assumed office in 1994. But a Supreme Court challenge led by the Congress saw this move deemed unconstitutional and the parliament was restored. The vote of no-confidence proceeded successfully. Elections in 1995 saw Adhikari's government voted out of office and made Nepali Congress's Sher Bahadur Deuba the next Prime Minister of Nepal.

Ministers

References

Cabinet of Nepal
1994 in Nepal
Cabinets established in 1994
Cabinets disestablished in 1995
1994 establishments in Nepal
1995 disestablishments in Nepal